The Pop Disaster Tour was a concert tour co-headlined by American rock bands Blink-182 and Green Day. The two groups, with supporting acts Jimmy Eat World, Kut U Up, and Saves the Day, toured for two months across the United States and Canada, mostly in outdoor amphitheatres.

Background
The tour was conceived by Blink-182 to echo the famous Monsters of Rock tours; the idea was to have, effectively, a Monsters of Punk tour. The tour, from the band's point of view, had been put together as a show of unity in the face of consistent accusations of rivalry between the two bands, especially in Europe. Instead, Green Day's Tré Cool acknowledged in a Kerrang! interview that they committed to the tour as an opportunity to regain their status at the top of the tree, as their spotlight had faded over the years. "We set out to reclaim our throne as the most incredible live punk band from you know who", said Cool. Cool contended that "we heard they were going to quit the tour because they were getting smoked so badly […] We didn't want them to quit the tour. They're good for filling up the seats up front."

Riding in Vans with Boys

The 2003 film Riding in Vans with Boys follows the Pop Disaster Tour throughout the U.S from Kut U Up's perspective. DeLonge and Hoppus had the idea for the film, and enlisted Matt Beauchesne, who also worked on their documentary The Urethra Chronicles II: Harder Faster Faster Harder, to direct. It was designed to be "a social experiment that shows exactly what would happen if an average Joe band spent two months with two of the biggest groups in rock."

Performances

Green Day
"Maria"
"Longview"
"Welcome to Paradise"
"Hitchin' a Ride"
"Brain Stew"
"Jaded"
"2000 Light Years Away"
"Knowledge"
"Basket Case"
"She"
"King for a Day / Shout"
"Waiting"
"Minority"
"When I Come Around"
"Good Riddance (Time of Your Life)"

Blink-182
"Anthem, Part Two"
"The Rock Show"
"Dumpweed"
"Going Away to College"
"What's My Age Again?"
"Please Take Me Home"
"Happy Holidays, You Bastard"
"Adam's Song"
"First Date"
"Man Overboard" or "Carousel"
"When You Fucked Grandpa"
"Dysentery Gary" or "Story of a Lonely Guy"
"Family Reunion"
"Don't Leave Me"
"Stay Together for the Kids"
"All the Small Things"
"Everytime I Look for You" or "What Went Wrong"
"Reckless Abandon" (including Travis Barker drum solo)
"Dammit"

Tour dates

Reception
All of the reviewers were unimpressed with Blink-182's headlining set following Green Day. "Sometimes playing last at a rock show is more a curse than a privilege […] Pity the headliner, for instance, that gets blown off the stage by the band before it. Blink-182 endured that indignity Saturday at the Shoreline Amphitheatre", a reporter for the San Francisco Chronicle wrote in 2002.

The Pop Disaster Tour as a whole grossed nearly $20 million from 45 shows.

Personnel 

Green Day
 Billie Joe Armstrong – guitar, harmonica, lead vocals
 Mike Dirnt – bass guitar, backing vocals
 Tré Cool – drums, percussion, additional vocals on "King For A Day" and "Shout"
Tour Members
 Jason White – rhythm guitar, additional vocals on "King For A Day"
 Kurt Lohmiller – trumpet, additional vocals on "King For A Day"
 Marco Villanova – trombone, additional vocals on "King For A Day"

blink-182
 Mark Hoppus – bass guitar, vocals
 Tom DeLonge – guitar, vocals
 Travis Barker – drums, percussion

See also
Hella Mega Tour

References

Notes

External links
 Official Blink-182 website
 Official Green Day website

2002 concert tours
Blink-182 concert tours
Co-headlining concert tours
Green Day concert tours